Oscar Newman may refer to:

 Oscar Newman, architect and city planner known for his defensible space theory
 Oscar W. Newman (1867–1928), jurist in Ohio, United States